Kiss II is a 1962 pop art painting by Roy Lichtenstein. It formerly held the record for highest auction price for a Lichtenstein painting.

In May 1990, Kiss II, sold for $6.0 million. In November 2002, Happy Tears surpassed Kiss II Lichtenstein work record auction price, when it sold for $7.2 million.

See also
 1962 in art

Notes

External links
Lichtenstein Foundation website

1962 paintings
Paintings by Roy Lichtenstein
Kissing